Ibrahim Taiwo (died 13 February 1976) was a Military Governor of Kwara State from July 1975 to February 1976 during the military regime of General Murtala Mohammed.
He assisted in establishment of the University of Ilorin, which was founded by decree August, 1975.

Life
Taiwo was born in Wushishi, Niger State to the family of Adeosun and Emily Taiwo. He was brought up in Kagara and was sometimes called Ibrahim Kagara while he was in school. Taiwo's father was of Ogbomosho ancestry. Ibrahim Taiwo was educated at Senior Primary School, Minna, Bida Middle School, and briefly attended the Provincial Secondary School, Okene for his Higher School Certificate.

Military career
Taiwo joined the military in 1961, he started military training at the Nigerian Military Training College, Kaduna and also attended Mons Officer Cadet School, Aldershot. While in the army, he served as a mechanical transport officer, Officer Commanding 2 Brigade Transport in Apapa, Staff Captain, Army Headquarters, Lagos,  Officer in charge of 8 Brigade, Asaba and then Officer in charge of the Transport Company, Kaduna. During the Civil War, he was head of the transport and supplies division of the Nigerian Army.

Participation in the Nigerian counter-coup of July 1966
Taiwo, then a Captain with the Lagos Garrison in Yaba, was one of the many officers (including 2nd Lieutenant Sani Abacha, Lieutenant Muhammadu Buhari, Lieutenant Ibrahim Bako, Lt Colonel Murtala Muhammed, and Major Theophilus Danjuma among others), who staged what became known as the Nigerian counter-coup of 1966 because of grievances they felt towards the administration of General Aguiyi Ironsi's government which quelled the 15 January 1966 coup.

Participation in the Nigerian Military Coup of  1975
Taiwo played a central role in the coup that ousted Yakubu Gowon and brought Murtala Mohammed to power, under cover of his Supply and Transport duties in the army, working closely with Lt. Col. Muhammadu Buhari.

Casualty of the 1976 Military Coup
Colonel Ibrahim Taiwo was the military governor of kwara state at the time of 13 February 1976 during a failed coup in which the then Head of State Gen. Murtala Mohammed was also killed, he was also killed by the coup plotters because he was an ally of the late Head of state. General Olusegun Obasanjo was later appointed as Head of State keeping the rest of Gen. Murtala Mohammed's Chain of command in place.

References

Year of birth missing
1976 deaths
Graduates of the Mons Officer Cadet School
People from Niger State
Nigerian Muslims
Yoruba military personnel
Nigerian Army officers
Governors of Kwara State
Participants in the 1966 Nigerian counter-coup
Military personnel of the Nigerian Civil War
Participants in the 1975 Nigerian military coup
Participants in the 1976 Nigerian military coup
People murdered in Nigeria
1976 murders in Nigeria